The Acorn RISC OS character set was used in the Acorn Archimedes series and subsequent computers from 1987 onwards. It is an extension of ISO/IEC 8859-1.

Code page layout (standard)
At 0x83 is a box with another box inside it on the top left-hand corner, meaning "resize window". At 0x84 is a 'bubble-writing' X, meaning "close window". At 0x87 is an unusual character that is a subscript 8 followed by a superscript 7. It is not proposed for Unicode.  At 0x88, 0x89, 0x8A, and 0x8B are left, right, up, and down bubble arrows for window scrollbars. The Homerton font does not have these characters. EFF, a third-party supplier of RISC OS outline fonts, has a different, but similar character set.

The following table shows the RISC OS character set. Each character is shown with a potential Unicode equivalent if available. Space and control characters are represented by the abbreviations for their names. Differences from ISO-8859-1 are shown with darker shading on top of their legend colours.

Code page layout (Electronic Font Foundry 1.1)
This RISC OS Latin-1 character set was used by Electronic Font Foundry.

Code page layout (BBC Master microcomputer)
This character set was used in the BBC Master microcomputer.

Code page layout (TRC)

References

Further reading

Character sets
Acorn Computers
RISC OS
Computer-related introductions in 1987